Greek valerian is a common name for several plants and may refer to:

Polemonium caeruleum, native to Europe
Polemonium reptans, native to North America